Fred R. Lazarus Jr. (October 29, 1884 – May 27, 1973) was an American founder of Federated Department Stores, which became Macy's, Inc.

Early life
Fred Lazarus Jr. was born to a Jewish family on October 29, 1884, the son of Rose (née Eichberg) and Fred Lazarus. He was the second of four brothers, Simon Sr. (August 19, 1882 – December 21, 1947), Robert Sr. (September 20, 1890 – February 4, 1973), and Jeffrey Sr. (June 20, 1894 – 1975). He grew up working in his family's store, F. & R. Lazarus, founded by his grandfather Simon Lazarus, an immigrant retailer. He briefly attended Ohio State University, but dropped out at the age of 18 to work full-time in the store.

Businessman career
In 1928, the company purchased The John Shillito Company department store in Cincinnati. In the summer of 1929, months before the Wall Street Crash of 1929, Lazarus met with Walter N. Rothschild from Abraham & Straus of Brooklyn and Edward Filene from Filene's of Boston on Rothschild's yacht in Long Island Sound. The three businessmen agreed to merge their stores and form Federated Department Stores, of which "Mr. Fred" was the chairman. Bloomingdale's of New York joined in 1930. Under his leadership, Federated eventually became the largest department store company in the United States. 

Lazarus himself exerted enormous financial, social, and political clout; he is credited with convincing President Franklin D. Roosevelt in 1939 to move Thanksgiving a week earlier, to the fourth Thursday in November instead of the last Thursday in November, in order to make the Christmas shopping season longer in those years on which November had 5 Thursdays.

The Lazarus family pioneered many shopping firsts such as the concept of "one low price" (in which no bargaining was required); theirs was also the first department store with escalators and the first air conditioned store in the country.

Personal life
Lazarus married twice. In 1911, he married Meta Marx; she died in 1932. They had 4 children: Fred Lazarus III, Ralph Lazarus, Maurice Lazarus, and Ann Lazarus. In 1935, he married Celia Kahn Rosenthal.

Fred Lazarus Jr. is interred in the Lazarus Family Mausoleum in Greenlawn Cemetery, Columbus, Ohio.

References

External links
Federated Department Stores Chronology
 Mentions Thanksgiving story.

1884 births
1973 deaths
American businesspeople in retailing
American Jews
Businesspeople from Columbus, Ohio
Lazarus, Fred Jr.
American retail chief executives
20th-century American businesspeople